Jedidiah Custer Bradley (born June 12, 1990) is an American former Major League Baseball pitcher who played for the Atlanta Braves in 2016.

Career

Amateur
Bradley graduated from Huntsville High School in Huntsville, Alabama. He had an appendectomy that year, and played in only six games for his school's baseball team. He attended the Georgia Institute of Technology, where he played for the Georgia Tech Yellow Jackets baseball team. In 2010, he played collegiate summer baseball with the Wareham Gatemen of the Cape Cod Baseball League, where he was a league all-star. As a junior, in 2011, he had a 7-3 win–loss record and a 3.49 earned run average (ERA). He was named to the All-Atlantic Coast Conference's second-team. Bradley would later return to Georgia Tech to complete his degree, graduating with high honors in August 2018.

Milwaukee Brewers
The Milwaukee Brewers selected Bradley in the first round, with the 15th overall selection, of the 2011 Major League Baseball draft. Bradley made his professional debut with the Brevard County Manatees of the Class A-Advanced Florida State League in 2012, but struggled, pitching to a 5.53 ERA. He remained with Brevard County in 2013, when his season ended prematurely due to a shoulder injury, and began the 2014 season there as well. For Brevard County in 2014, Bradley had a 5–2 record in 10 starts with a 2.98 ERA and 53 strikeouts in  innings pitched, before he was promoted to the Huntsville Stars of the Class AA Southern League in late May 2014. In 2015, the Brewers transitioned Bradley into a relief pitcher. He split the 2015 season between the Biloxi Shuckers of the Southern League and the Colorado Springs Sky Sox of the Class AAA Pacific Coast League. Bradley began the 2016 season with Biloxi.

Atlanta Braves
On June 3, 2016, the Brewers traded Bradley to the Atlanta Braves for a player to be named later or cash considerations. He resumed working as a starting pitcher, playing for the Mississippi Braves of the Southern League and the Gwinnett Braves of the Class AAA International League. The Braves promoted Bradley to the major leagues on September 1. He made his major league debut on September 3, earning the win.

Baltimore Orioles
After the 2016 season, the Baltimore Orioles claimed Bradley off of waivers from the Braves, and outrighted him to the minor leagues on November 9. 
The Orioles invited Bradley to spring training in 2017. He pitched for the Bowie Baysox of the Class AA Eastern League announced his retirement on May 4, 2017.

New Britain Bees
On March 19, 2019, Bradley came out of retirement to sign with the New Britain Bees of the Atlantic League of Professional Baseball. He became a free agent following the season.

References

External links

1990 births
Living people
Sportspeople from Huntsville, Alabama
Baseball players from Alabama
Major League Baseball pitchers
Atlanta Braves players
Georgia Tech Yellow Jackets baseball players
Wareham Gatemen players
Brevard County Manatees players
Huntsville Stars players
New Britain Bees players
Peoria Javelinas players
Biloxi Shuckers players
Colorado Springs Sky Sox players
Mississippi Braves players
Gwinnett Braves players